Spindle Geyser is a geyser in the Lower Geyser Basin of Yellowstone National Park in the U.S. state of Wyoming.

Spindle Geyser is part of the White Creek Group which includes A-0 Geyser and Botryoidal Spring.  It is found along the bank of White Creek about 1⁄2 mile (0.8 km) southeast of the Surprise Pool parking area.

It erupts for a duration of a few seconds with an interval of 1–3 minutes between eruptions. Eruptions tend to be small, sometimes no more than a vigorous roiling of the pool but can reach . Spindle also generates subterranean thumps that can be felt when standing near the geyser.

References

Geysers of Wyoming
Geothermal features of Teton County, Wyoming
Geothermal features of Yellowstone National Park
Geysers of Teton County, Wyoming